The 2006–07 Swedish Figure Skating Championships were held in Borås from December 6 through 10, 2006. Because they were held in December, they were officially designated by the Swedish federation as the 2006 Swedish Championships, but the champions are the 2007 Swedish Champions. Senior-level (Olympic-level), junior-level, and two age-group levels of novice (Riksmästerskap (RM) and UngdomsSM (USM)) level skaters competed in the disciplines of men's singles, ladies' singles, and pair skating. This event was used to help choose the Swedish teams for the 2007 World Championships, the 2007 European Championships, and the 2007 World Junior Championships.

Senior results

Men
Guest skater Michael Chrolenko of Norway placed 3rd with a score of 127.72. Because he was a guest skater, his result is not listed on the tables below. Justus Strid, who placed fourth on the day, is the bronze medalist.

Ladies

Junior results

Men

Ladies

Novice USM results

Boys

Girls

Novice RM results

Boys

Girls

Youth

Pairs

External links
 2006–07 Swedish Championships results

2006 in figure skating
2007 in figure skating
Swedish Figure Skating Championships
Figure Skating Championships
Figure Skating Championships
Sports competitions in Borås